The 1927 Western Kentucky State Normal Hilltoppers football team represented Western Kentucky State Normal School and Teachers College (now known as Western Kentucky University) as a member of the Southern Intercollegiate Athletic Association during the 1927 college football season. They were coached by Edgar Diddle in his sixth year.

Schedule

References

Western Kentucky State Normal
Western Kentucky Hilltoppers football seasons
Western Kentucky State Normal Hilltoppers football